The Hotel Café is a live music venue located off an alley on the Cahuenga Boulevard strip in Hollywood, California, United States, that has become known for helping to establish the careers of new singer-songwriters in the 2000s. The venue began as a coffee shop, but has gained a reputation as an intimate performance space featuring acoustic-based songwriters, such as John Mayer, Adele, Brandy Norwood, Damien Rice, Anna Nalick, Sara Bareilles, Katy Perry, Ingrid Michaelson, Tony Lucca, Priscilla Ahn, Charlotte Martin, Emi Meyer, Laura Jansen and Meiko. The venue has become its own brand, with its Hotel Café Tour, a record label, and two albums, Live at the Hotel Café, Volume 1, and The Hotel Café Presents...Winter Songs, that are downloadable via the iTunes Store.

History
When The Hotel Café opened in 2000, it operated as a coffee shop where singer-songwriters came to perform their material for small audiences. Co-owner Maximillian Mamikunian has noted that in the venue's early days, turning a profit was challenging, as the cafe's steamers and blenders could only be run between songs so as not to drown them out.<ref name="Knowing How to Play the Room">"Knowing How to Play the Room". 2008. Los Angeles Times". Retrieved on November 14, 2010</ref> Today, the venue's main room still has its five original elevated bar tables running along a hallway linking the front and back of the club, as well as six dinner tables set immediately in front of the stage. In 2004, the club acquired space next door and underwent expansion for eight months.

The Hotel continues to host live music seven nights a week, from touring national acts to up-and-coming locals.  Past notable performances have included: Adele, Brandy Norwood, The Lumineers, Chris Martin of Coldplay, Mac Miller, Billie Eilish, Dave Chappelle, Haim, Bruno Mars, Lord Huron, Hozier, John Mayer, Mumford and Sons, Ray Lamontagne, Damien Rice, Katy Perry, Sara Bareilles, Ingrid Michaelson, Gary Clark Jr., Fitz and the Tantrums, Ed Sheeran, Pete Townshend, Laura Marling, Imogen Heap, Billy Corgan, Lucinda Williams, Leonard Cohen, Weezer, Alanis Morissette, Tenacious D, Bruno Mars, Sia and many others.

Significant activity
Since 2004, the club has curated an annual group musical tour. Past featured artists have included Sara Bareilles, Meiko, Rachael Yamagata, Brooke Fraser, and many others. Most stops are in the United States, but past tours have also included performances in Norway and Switzerland.

In October 2008, The Hotel Cafe concluded talks with iTunes that paved the way for official Live from The Hotel Café downloads that debuted the following month. Also in October of the same year, an album of four Hotel Café regulars was featured and offered for sale at over 2,100 Starbucks locations. The club's eponymous record label has seen success with The Hotel Café Presents...Winter Songs and Live at the Hotel Café, Volume 1. Other artists, including Matt Hires, have recorded live albums at the club under other record labels. John Mayer has also played surprise shows at the cafe and has tried out new songs from his past two albums before their release.

The Hotel Café's website, like the venue itself, has served as a source for new artists to be tapped by music enthusiasts and industry professionals alike. Grey's Anatomy music supervisor Alexandra Patsavas has used both the website and club itself as sources for discovering artists and songs she uses on the show. Meiko, an artist who hit the No. 1 folk spot on iTunes in August 2008, was discovered by Patsavas via The Hotel Café, as was the English singer-songwriter Adele. Another artist favored by Patsavas for use on Grey's Anatomy, Greg Laswell, has praised the club for its "rare" environment and has become one of its regulars.

References

Bordal, Christian (March 11, 2008). "A Musical Residency at Hollywood's Hotel Café". NPR. Retrieved on November 2, 2008.
Humphries, Stephen. (October 10, 2007). "L.A.'s Hotel Café is favored haunt for singer-songwriters". The Christian Science Monitor''. Retrieved on November 2, 2008.

External links

Music venues in Los Angeles
Music venues completed in 2000